Cristián Huneeus (1935–1985) was a Chilean essayist and writer.

Biography
In 1958 Cristián Huneeus began collaborating with articles in the Pomaire magazine. Their journalistic deliveries appeared in different national journals, but mainly in the magazines Cormorán and Mensaje, where he published articles until 1983. Later, from 1977 to 1985, he evolved columnist in Hoy and Cal. Also, he was contributor in newspapers El Mercurio, La Nación, the Tercera and La Razón (Petorca). In this last newspaper he worked since he fixed his residence in the Valley of the Ligua in 1980. After the death of Cristián Huneeus in 1985, his daughter Daniela Huneeus (anthropologist) altogether with Manuel Vicuña (investigator of the Centro Barros Arana) published a book of press articles written by Huneeus between 1969 and 1985.

Works
 
 
 
 
 
 
 
 
 
 
 
 
 
 
 
 
 
 
 
 
 
 
 
 
 
 
 
  Prologue by Roberto Merino.

External links

References
 el exilio de Cristián Huneuus Ercilla 1592, 36–37 Memoria Chilena

1935 births
1985 deaths
Chilean essayists
Chilean people of German descent
People from Santiago
20th-century essayists